Thwaite is a small village in the Yorkshire Dales, North Yorkshire, England. It is in Swaledale and is part the district of Richmondshire and the civil parish of Muker. The name "Thwaite" comes from the Old Norse word þveit, meaning 'clearing, meadow or paddock'.

History
The village was the home and birthplace of Richard and Cherry Kearton, who were pioneers in wildlife photography at the end of the 19th century. The Kearton name lives on in the Kearton tea rooms and guesthouse in the centre of the village and the Kearton Country Hotel.

Local legend has it that the bridge over Thwaite Beck, was washed away during a fierce thunderstorm in the late 19th century. No-one was injured but a pig, that was taken by the waters, managed to climb out of the beck further downstream. A flash flood did hit the village in 1899, which resulted in the destruction of some outbuildings and gardens. Due to the de-population of Thwaite at that time (because of the decline in the mining industry) many of the structures were not repaired.

Thwaite has two long-distance walking paths running through it: the Coast to Coast and the Pennine Way. There are two parts to the Coast to Coast; one that goes north of Thwaite and across the hills to Reeth and the other goes through the village and across the valley floor. The Herriot Way also runs through the village, which as it passes through Thwaite, is on the same course as the Pennine Way.

Aircraft crash
On the 28 January 1943, a Handley Page Halifax of No. 1659 Heavy Conversion Unit RAF (HCU), crashed on the eastern side of Great Shunner Fell. All crew were rescued from the aircraft by Sergeant C L Pudney, although 3 later died of their wounds. After rescuing his crew, Sgt Pudney trekked the  into Thwaite to raise the alarm. Whilst Sgt Pudney was awarded the George Medal for his heroic actions, he was unable to receive the award as he was killed when the No. 405 RCAF Squadron Halifax he was flying in was struck by lightning and crashed at King's Lynn on the 13 June 1943.

Thwaite in popular culture
Thwaite has been cited as the setting of Misselthwaite Manor in the book The Secret Garden by Frances Hodgson Burnett. However, in the book Space and Place in Children's Literature it states that the Thwaite in the book bears no relation to Thwaite in North Yorkshire.

References

External links

Villages in North Yorkshire
Swaledale